Money Talks is a 1972 American documentary film directed by Allen Funt. The film was released on August 30, 1972, by United Artists.

Synopsis

As in his Candid Camera television show, Allen Funt uses a hidden camera to record the reaction of people placed in bizarre situations, all of which, in this case, relate to money. In New York, Kansas City, Boston, Miami and Switzerland, bystanders are placed in unusual circumstances to determine how they will react. Various exploits include: A public pay-for-use bathroom is outfitted with a sign announcing that penalties will be charged for those staying longer than five minutes; a bowl of dollars with a sign stating "Take One" is placed on a busy city street, with most bystanders obeying the admonition; a man at a lunch counter salts his dollar bills and then eats them; a woman walks down a street, dropping money, and various people either steal or return the cash; a black young man declares that George Washington was black and should be represented as such on the dollar bill; a furrier is asked to fit a Great Dane for a mink coat; and an older woman, hired to answer phones at an expensive apartment building, finds herself fielding calls and quoting rates for Mafia hitmen. In other sequences, Funt interviews people directly, asking them such questions as why they are willing to live off their parents' money and why they panhandle. Boxer Muhammad Ali offers an unsuspecting delivery man boxing lessons in lieu of payment, while comedian Henny Youngman trades one-liner jokes in exchange for goods. Finally, when Allen asks his five-year-old daughter Juliet about the importance of money, she responds that "the most important thing in the whole wide world is heart."

Cast
Muhammad Ali as himself
David McHarris as himself / Tap dance
Marian Mercer as herself / Waitress
Henny Youngman as himself
Jack London as himself / Money eater
Joseph R. Sicari as himself / Dog owner 
Jackie Bright as himself / Wheeler dealer
Ann Myles as herself
Guy King as himself / Rest room attendant
Peter Hock as himself
Karen Fund as herself / Money dropper
Erin Peeters as herself / Panhandler
Tony Bell as himself / Boy tipper
Ira Kosloff as himself
Robbie Manning as himself
Juliet Funt as herself
Lulu-May Brown as herself
Joya Gingold as herself
Rubin Pochtar as himself
Fezwick DaPoochie as himself
Elizabeth Fisher as herself
Jack Avidon as himself
Norman Hilliard as himself
Eva Barthfeld as herself
Michael C. Roberts as himself
Arthur Miller as himself
John L. Smith as himself
Cristobal Correa as himself

See also
 List of American films of 1972

References

External links
 

1972 films
United Artists films
American documentary films
1972 documentary films
Films directed by Allen Funt
1970s English-language films
1970s American films